Joseph Patrick Pérez Mancilla (born June 9, 1997), known as Joseph Pérez, is an American professional soccer player who plays as a defender for Los Angeles Force in the National Independent Soccer Association.

Club career

In July 2018, Pérez was loaned to the Las Vegas Lights of the United Soccer League during the team's inaugural season.

In February 2020, Pérez was signed by San Diego 1904 FC of the National Independent Soccer Association for its Spring 2020 season. He made his debut on February 29 on the road against Stumptown Athletic and scored his first professional goal in the 36th minute.

In March 2021, Pérez joined Los Angeles Force ahead of the 2021 season.

Notes

References

External links
 
 

1997 births
Living people
American soccer players
Club Puebla players
Las Vegas Lights FC players
Soccer players from Anaheim, California
USL Championship players
National Independent Soccer Association players
Association football defenders